Charles Jasper Joly (27 June 1864 – 4 January 1906) was an Irish mathematician and astronomer who became Royal Astronomer of Ireland.

Life
He was born at St Catherine's Rectory, Hop Hill, Tullamore, County Offaly, the eldest of six children of Rev. John Swift Joly (1818-1887) and Elizabeth Slator (1835-1904).

He was educated at Galway Grammar School and later at Trinity College Dublin, where he took a fellowship in 1894. He became Andrews Professor of Astronomy at Trinity College.

In 1897, he was appointed Royal Astronomer of Ireland and he took up his new position at Dunsink Observatory. He was secretary of the Royal Irish Academy and a Fellow of the Royal Astronomical Society. He was made a Fellow of the Royal Society in 1904.

He died at his residence in Dunsink, County Dublin, in 1906.

Publications
 William Rowan Hamilton and C.J. Joly:  Elements of Quaternions (volume I, 1899) Longmans, Green & Co, (volume II, 1901).
 Quaternions and Projective Geometry (1903) Philosophical Transactions of the Royal Society of London 201:223–327.
 A Manual of Quaternions (1905) from Cornell University Historical Math Monographs

Charles Joly published his articles in Royal Irish Academy journals, generally the Transactions, but as indicated below, in Proceedings of the Royal Irish Academy in 1897, 98, and 99:
 1892: Theory of linear vector functions. 30:597 to 647.
 1896: Properties of general congruency of curves. 31:363 to 92.
 1897: On the homographic divisions of planes, spheres, and space and on the systems of lines joining corresponding points. Proceedings RIA 4(4): 515.
 1898: The associative algebra applicable to hyperspace. Proceedings R.I.A. 5(1):73 to 123.
 1899: Astaties and quaternion functions. Proceedings R.I.A. 5(3):366.
 1902: Interpretation of a quaternion as a point symbol. 32A: 1 to 16.
 1902: Quaternion arrays. 32:17 to 30.
 1902: Quadratic screw system: a study of a family of quadratic complexes. 32A:155 to 238.
 1902: Geometry of a three-system of screws. 32A:239 to 70.

References

Sources
 G. B. Mathews (1907) "C. J. Joly", Proceedings of the London Mathematical Society vols 2–4, issue 1, p. 1.

External links
 

1864 births
1906 deaths
19th-century Irish mathematicians
20th-century Irish mathematicians
Academics of Trinity College Dublin
Alumni of Trinity College Dublin
Directors of Dunsink Observatory
Fellows of the Royal Society
Irish astronomers
Irish mathematicians
People from Tullamore, County Offaly